The Morgan Creek Fire was a wildfire that started north of Steamboat Springs, Colorado on July 9, 2021. The fire burned  and was fully contained on October 14, 2021.

Events

July 
The Morgan Creek Fire was first reported on July 9, 2021, at around 1:00 pm MDT.

Cause 
The cause of the fire is believed to be due to lightning.

Containment 
On October 14, 2021, the Morgan Creek Fire reached 100% containment.

Impact

Closures and Evacuations

See also 

 2021 Colorado wildfires
 List of Colorado wildfires

References 

2021 in Colorado
Wildfires in Colorado
July 2021 events in the United States
2021 Colorado wildfires